Zhvyrka is an urban-type settlement in Chervonohrad Raion of Lviv Oblast in Ukraine. It is located on the left bank of the Western Bug. Zhvyrka belongs to Sokal urban hromada, one of the hromadas of Ukraine. Population: 

Until 18 July 2020, Zhvyrka belonged to Sokal Raion. The raion was abolished in July 2020 as part of the administrative reform of Ukraine, which reduced the number of raions of Lviv Oblast to seven. The area of Sokal Raion was merged into Chervonohrad Raion.

Economy

Transportation
Sokal railway station is located in Zhvyrka, on a railway which connects Lviv via Chervonohrad with Volodymyr-Volynskyi.

The settlement is connected by road with Chervonohrad, where it have further access to Lviv via Zhovkva.

References

Urban-type settlements in Chervonohrad Raion